European Transactions on Telecommunications is a peer-reviewed scientific journal covering all aspects of information technology and telecommunications.

Abstracting and indexing 
The journal is abstracted and indexed in the following databases:

According to the Journal Citation Reports, the journal has a 2010 impact factor of 0.448, ranking it 55th out of 78 journals in the category "Telecommunications".

References

External links 
 

Electrical and electronic engineering journals
Publications established in 1990
Wiley-Blackwell academic journals
English-language journals